The 2011 Union Budget of India was present by Pranab Mukherjee, the Finance Minister of India on 28 February 2011. This budgetary proposals would be applicable from 1 April 2011 to 31 March 2012.

Highlights 

Some salient features:
 Individual income tax exempt slab increased from  160,000 to  180,000.
 Food inflation, corruption still a concern
 Targets: To keep inflation at 5%, fiscal deficit at 4.6% while fiscal deficit for previous year was 5.1%, revenue deficit at 1.8%. Indian economy expected to grow at 9%.
 Overall social sector spending up by 17%, education spending up by 24%.
 Direct transfer of subsidy for BPL people for kerosene and LPG
 Govt provides subsidy on food, electricity to provide for the common man. This to continue
 FDI Policy: All procedures consolidated as a single document
 SEBI-registered mutual funds can accept foreign investors
 FII investment in corporate bonds will be raised to US$40 billion
 Legislative amendments in Banking Laws soon
  to Public sector banks to maintain CRAR (Capital to Risk Weighted Assets Ratio)
 Women SHG development fund to be set up
 Rural Infrastructure Development fund to be raised 
  to NABARD for textile development
 15 mega food parks for vegetables
  9 billion towards pulses, protein production
 107 cold storage project has been approved to minimise food wastage. Cold storage will be recognised as infrastructure sub-sector
 National Mission for Electric and Hybrid vehicle to be launched
 Self-assessment in customs to be introduced
 Seven mega leather clusters will be set up, Jodhpur to have handicraft mega cluster
 Govt put into operation 5-point agenda with legislation to curb black money, 11 tax information exchange treaty signed
 A comprehensive national policy in narcotic drug trafficking in near future
  for food security. This forms 36 per cent of budget allocation
  for various schemes on rural development
 Telecom connectivity to all panchayats
 Anganwadi workers will get higher remuneration of  3000 per month.  1500 for Anganwadi helpers
  allocated for education
  for primary education to implement free and compulsory education for children
 National Knowledge Network will link 1500 institutes by 2012
  5 billion+ to various universities across the country
  5 billion for National Skill Development Fund
 Eligibility of old age pension for BPL reduced to 60 years. Pension amount for people aged above 80 years increased to  500
  for Judiciary
 Caste based census will be carried out as a separate exercise in June 2011
 80 years above will come under very senior citizen – a new category with tax exemption up to  500,000
 MAT increased to 18.5%
 Concessional excise duty of 10% for hybrid vehicles
 Customs duty on solar lanterns reduced to 5 per cent
 Nominal one per cent central excise duty on 130 items entering the tax net. Earlier there were 370 items which were under the bracket of state VAT but were exempted from Central Excise. Out of these 130 come under the bracket from now. Rest are expected to be included from the induction of GST
 Defence budget hiked to

Taxation 
Main tax-related changes:

The basic exemption limit in the case of individuals increased from  160,000 to  180,000. However, there is no increase in basic exemption limit in the case of Resident Women who is below 60 years at any time during the previous year.
The qualifying age limit for senior citizens has been lowered from 60 years to 65 years and increased the current exemption limit under two categories.
Category −1 – Age of Individual – 60 years or more but less than 80 years at any time during the previous year. The basic exemption limit is increased from  240,000 to  250,000.
Category – 2 –   Age of Individual beyond 80 years or more at any time during the previous year. The basic exemption limit is  500,000.
No need to file returns if the Income is less than or equal  500,000.
In the case of domestic companies the surcharge has been reduced from 7.5% to 5%.
In the companies other than domestic companies the surcharge has been reduced from 2.5% to 2%.
The definition of charitable purpose u/s 2 (15) includes "the advancement of any other object of general public utility". The monetary limit in respect of such activities has been enhanced from  1000,000 to  2500,000.
The amount paid by an assessee as an employer by way of contribution towards pension scheme, as referred to in sec 80CCD(2) on account of an employee to the extent it doesn't exceed 10% of the salary of employee in the previous year, shall be allowed as a deduction u/s 36 in computing the income under the head profit and gains of business or profession.
The Indian company which receives foreign dividend from foreign subsidiary company such dividend is taxable at the 15% as against 30% plus applicable surcharge.
The rate of MAT is increased to 18.5% from the existing rate of 18% of such book profit.
Minimum Alternative Tax has been introduced for Limited Liability Partnership (LLP) in line with MAT on companies with effect from the Assessment Year 2012–2013.
The Government exempts assesses having no other income other than salary from furnishing the return of income by notification. The proposed amendment shall be effective from 1 June 2011.
It is proposed to omit the requirement of quoting of Documentary Identification Number in notices / order / correspondences issued by Income tax department.
The SEZ developers are required to pay dividend distribution tax on dividends declared / distributed on or after 1 June 2011.
The deduction u/s 80CCF to investment in notified long term infrastructure bonds extended for the A.Y. 2012–13 also.
Liaison offices of a company will be required to file Annual Information in the prescribed form within the 60 days from the end of the financial year.
The tax holiday for power sector has been extended for further period of one year i.e. up to 31 March 2012.
 
Service tax
 
The following two new services have been proposed
Services by air conditioned restaurants having licence to serve liquor; and
short term accommodation hotels / inns / clubs / guest houses etc.
The monetary limit for adjustment of excess service tax paid is increased from  100,000 to  200,000.
The penalty for delayed payment of service tax u/s 76 has been reduced from 2% to 1% per month or  100 per day whichever is higher.
The maximum penalty reduced to 50% of the tax.
The rate of interest is reduced by 3% for assesses with turnover of up to  6 million.
The maximum penalty for delay in filing of return increased from  2,000 to  20,000.

References

External links 
 http://www.finmin.nic.in/index.asp

Union budgets of India
2011 in Indian economy
India